Dimitrij Nonin (born 5 April 1979) is a German gymnast. He finished 21st in the all around at the 2000 Summer Olympics.

References

External links
 

1979 births
Living people
German male artistic gymnasts
Olympic gymnasts of Germany
Gymnasts at the 2000 Summer Olympics
Sportspeople from Dnipro
20th-century German people
21st-century German people